Kalervo Hietala (born 24 February 1938) is a Finnish speed skater. He competed in two events at the 1964 Winter Olympics.

References

External links
 

1938 births
Living people
Finnish male speed skaters
Olympic speed skaters of Finland
Speed skaters at the 1964 Winter Olympics
People from Rovaniemi
Sportspeople from Lapland (Finland)